WPKL is a classic hits radio station licensed to Uniontown, Pennsylvania at 99.3 FM. WPKL's programming is simulcast on WKPL in Ellwood City, Pennsylvania, at 92.1 FM. Both stations are owned by Forever Media, and each has a power output of 3,000 watts.

History

Beginnings
WPKL first signed on the air December 20, 1968 as WPQR-FM, licensed to Warman Broadcasting Inc.; founded by Edwin Warman, with Ed Olesh serving as the station's first vice president and general manager.  For many of its early years, the station operated from an office building at 540 Morgantown Road in Uniontown.  WKPL first signed on the air as WFEM on August 4, 1968, and was owned by Ellwood City Broadcasting Company, a company owned by Herbert Scott, who also owned Great Scott Broadcasting Company, licensee of WKST in New Castle, about eight miles north of Ellwood City.  Studios and offices for WFEM were located at 226 Fifth Street in Ellwood City, from where it broadcast an easy listening music format.

WPQR sale and WFEM move
WPQR was purchased by Pittsburgh attorney Geoffrey P. Kelly on May 21, 1987, who operated the station under the corporate name Kel Com Broadcasting, Inc.  The Kel Com endeavor was a joint partnership between Kelly and Monroeville broadcaster Marlene J. Heshler, who had bought WCVI (AM) in nearby Connellsville (as Mar Com Broadcasting) two years before.  For many years following the sale, WPQR maintained a separate sales office in Uniontown, with on-air operations moving to WCVI's facilities at 133 East Crawford Avenue in downtown Connellsville.  In 1986, WFEM came under the control of Faye Scott following the death of Herb Scott in 1984.  Not long afterwards, WFEM's operations were moved to those of WKST at 219 Savannah-Garder Road in New Castle.

WFEM changes calls; WPQR partnership dissolved
By the end of the 1980s, WFEM changed its call letters to WKST-FM, to mirror that of its AM sister, but adopting the slogan "Star 92.1" after signing an affiliation agreement with the Satellite Music Network and adopting its "Starstation" adult contemporary format.  The early 1990s marked a period of financial distress for WPQR, but the circumstances surrounding it are still unknown.  Heshler and Kelly dissolved their partnership in 1991, but Heshler stayed on as General Manager for WPQR and sister station WCVI for a couple of years afterward, with Kelly taking ownership and control of both WCVI and WPQR.  Heshler left those stations for good by 1994.  At around the time of the dissolution, legal action had been taken against both stations by ASCAP/BMI over alleged unpaid music licensing fees.

WPQR bankruptcy and sale to present owner
WPQR would carry an adult contemporary format until 1999, when the station suddenly went dark.  According to the Pittsburgh Tribune-Review, the transmitter had broken down and no money was available to fix it.  To complicate matters even further, when the money became available, engineers were not permitted on the property where the transmitter and tower were located to make repairs because Kel Com had lapsed on its rental payments for the leased site. Complicating matters further than that, the property was owned by Fayette County court judge Gerald Solomon.  It also became known that Kel Com/Mar Com had also owed its employees back wages, including its succeeding General Manager, who had assumed Heshler's former duties.

WPQR and WCVI were totally automated by this time, using the services of Jones Radio Network's AC format for WPQR, and Music of Your Life for WCVI, offering little in the way of full-service programming elements, as much of the airstaff had left the station after not being paid.

Nevertheless, some of the station's employees, who were still owed the back wages, continued to work for free in a loyal, dedicated effort to keep both stations afloat through WCVI, which still remained on the air, even working in inhumane conditions, such as the heat being turned off in the building, due to a lapse in utility bill payments. WPQR and WCVI were eventually forced to move to a ground floor office at 131 East Crawford Avenue in the same building, as the second and third floor offices at 133 East Crawford were deemed unsafe by the state Health Department, due largely to a tree growing out of the back of the building that was compromising its structural integrity.

WPQR was also issued an FCC monetary forfeiture of $20,000 in March 2000 for tower marking and registration violations, as well as failing to install new EAS equipment, which replaced the former EBS system.  The licenses for both WCVI and WPQR were turned over to bankruptcy receiver Robert H. Slone of Greensburg in August of that same year.

Both stations were sold in a bankruptcy bid sale in November 2000 for $475,000, along with the WCVI tower site.

After the sale
Keymarket took WCVI off the air and immediately began work to overhaul the transmitter sites of both it and WPQR, restoring both to the air in August 2001.  Keymarket successfully applied for the new call letters WPKL, to represent its new format flip to oldies, via ABC's Oldies Radio, as "The Pickle".  WCVI returned under the new call letters WPNT (WPNT later changed to WYJK), and simulcasts WPKL.  No real information on why "The Pickle" was chosen as their name (it's believed that the name was an homage to Pittsburgh's Heinz foods, which also produces pickles), but it is one-of-a-kind.  WPKL simulcasts on co-owned WKPL-FM 92.1 in Ellwood City, Pennsylvania.

Upon the sale, WPKL and WYJK moved its operations out of the Crawford Avenue building to the building housing its sister stations along Route 88 in California, Pennsylvania, just north of Brownsville.  About five years later, those stations moved from that location to another complex at the junction of I-79 and I-279 in Greentree.  The Crawford Avenue building today, after years of hearings over ownership liability, has since been sold.  It still stands vacant.

WPKL today
In August 2001, Keymarket hired Robert "Fish" Herring as their new morning DJ.  Herring previously worked at Washington County oldies competitor WJPA.  Herring left the station in 2012. The morning show is hosted by longtime Pittsburgh radio personality Phil Kirzyc, the Kielbasi Kid.

Following the morning show, WPKL airs Classic Hits programming from Westwood One using Storq technology.

References

Daily Courier: WCVI Building Owner to Pay
Daily Courier: WCVI Building Owner Fined
Tribune Review: Former radio building owner fined after violating city's building codes
Daily Courier: Time running out for owner of WCVI building
Daily Courier: WCVI building brought up to code
 1967 Broadcasting Yearbook
 1971 Broadcasting Yearbook
 1975 Broadcasting Yearbook
 1981 Broadcasting Yearbook
 1983 Broadcasting Yearbook
 1987 Broadcasting Yearbook
 1988 Broadcasting Yearbook

External links
The Pickle Online

PKL
Uniontown, Pennsylvania
Radio stations established in 1968